The 1981 European Women Basketball Championship, commonly called EuroBasket Women 1981, was the 18th regional championship held by FIBA Europe. The competition was held in Italy and took place from 13 September to 20 September 1981.  won the gold medal and  the silver medal while  won the bronze.

Squads

First stage

Group A

Group B

Play-off stages

Final standings

External links 
 FIBA Europe profile
 Todor66 profile

 
1981
1981 in Italian women's sport
International women's basketball competitions hosted by Italy
September 1981 sports events in Europe
Euro